Willis Macon McCalman (December 30, 1932 – November 29, 2005) was an American television, stage and big screen movie actor.

Acting career
Nicknamed "Sonny", McCalman helped form the Front Street Theatre in his hometown of Memphis, Tennessee. During the Korean War, he served in the U.S. Army.  Over the course of his acting career McCalman appeared in various film and TV guest roles, usually in supporting parts, both dramatic and comedic often as heavies and authoritarian figures. He got his acting start on Broadway appearing in productions of The Last of Mrs. Lincoln (1971), An Enemy for the People (1971), and a comedy, The Playboy Of the Western World.

His first Hollywood film role was in Deliverance (1972). He had supporting parts in The Concorde ... Airport '79 (1979), The Falcon and the Snowman (1985), Fried Green Tomatoes (1991), and Falling Down (1993). He also appeared in the Roger Donaldson directed film Marie (1985). He appeared in guest roles in television shows such as Cheers, Starsky and Hutch, Kojak, Lou Grant, Three's Company, Murder She Wrote as well as such miniseries and television movies as Roots (1977) and Captains and the Kings (1976).

Death
McCalman retired from acting and returned to Memphis in 1997 after suffering a heart attack. He died in a Memphis hospital in 2005, one month shy of his 73rd birthday, from complications of a series of strokes.

Filmography

Film

 Deliverance (1972) .... Deputy Queen
 Lipstick (1976) .... Police Photographer
 Slap Shot (1977) .... Soap Opera patient (uncredited)
 Smokey and the Bandit (1977) .... Mr. B
 Comes a Horseman (1978) .... Virgil Hoverton
 The Pirate (1978) .... Hutchinson
 The Concorde ... Airport '79 (1979) .... Carl Parker
 The Last Word (1979) .... Welfare Caseworker
 The Incredible Shrinking Woman (1981) .... Dr. Atkins
 Dead & Buried (1981) .... Ben
 Carbon Copy (1981) .... Tubby Wederholt
 Rollover (1981) .... Jerry Fewster
 Timerider: The Adventure of Lyle Swann (1982) .... Dr. Sam
 Honkytonk Man (1982) .... Dr. Hines
 Fleshburn (1984) .... Earl Dana
 The Falcon and the Snowman (1985) .... Larry Rogers
 Cold Feet (1989) .... Store Owner
 Doc Hollywood (1991) .... Aubrey Draper
 Fried Green Tomatoes (1991) .... Prosecutor Percy
 Falling Down (1993) .... Detective Graham
 Murder Between Friends (1994) .... Janet’s Lawyer
 The Client (1994) .... Ballatine
 A Walk in the Clouds (1995) .... Conductor
 Rosewood (1997) .... Gov. Hardee (final film role)

Television

 Starsky & Hutch (1975) .... Officer Bernie Glassman
 Kojak (1976) .... McKee
 The Jeffersons (1976) (TV) .... Roger Tulley
 Captains and the Kings (1976; TV miniseries) .... Dolan
 The Bob Newhart Show (1977) .... Dr. Malcolm
 Maude (1977) .... Mark Duncan / Wendall Glendale
 Carter Country (1977) .... Drunk
 Roots (1977; TV miniseries) .... Poston
 Three's Company (1978) .... Mr. Penrose
 Hart to Hart (1979) .... Dr. Harry Capello
 The Waltons (1979-1980) .... Deputy Sheriff / Deputy Abe
 Three's Company (1979–1983) .... Roland Wood / Mr. Penrose
 Lou Grant (1981-1982) .... Dolph Masterson / Kibbee
 Diff'rent Strokes (1981-1983) .... Dr. Kalsa / George Endicott
 Cheers (1982) .... Darrell Stabell
 Remington Steele (1983) .... Uncle Tim
 Gloria (1983) .... Motel Manager
 Emerald Point N.A.S. (1983) .... Harry Bogard
 St. Elsewhere (1984) .... Henry Judson
 Newhart (1984) .... Paul Frazier
 The Red-Light Sting (1984) .... Jeffers
 Hill Street Blues (1984) .... Mr. Fitzgerald
 Knight Rider (1985) .... Calvin Holmes
 Family Ties (1986) .... Professor Spanos
 The Deliberate Stranger (1986) .... Larsen's editor
 Hunter (1987) TV series
 Silver Spoons (1987) .... Stockwell
 Dallas (1987) .... Gorman
 Murder, She Wrote (1987–1991) .... Nolan Hayes / Hotel Det. Fritz Rice
 Duet (1988) .... Mr. Paxton
 Perfect Strangers (1989) .... Dr. Shukin
 Guns of Paradise (1989) .... Warren Turtle
 L.A. Law (1989–1991) .... Judge Whitney Baldwin
 Designing Women (1989) .... Paul Webster
 Scattered Dreams (1993) .... Virgil
 The Wonder Years (1993) .... Karl Gustafson
 Lois & Clark: The New Adventures of Superman (1994) .... Willie
 Goode Behavior (1996) .... Mr. Kaufman

References

External links
 
 
 Macon McCalman(Aveleyman)

1932 births
2005 deaths
American male stage actors
American male film actors
American male television actors
Male actors from Memphis, Tennessee
United States Army personnel of the Korean War
20th-century American male actors